Andrea Marcucci (born 28 May 1965) is an Italian politician.

Biography 
Marcucci began his political career at the age of 25 in 1990 when he became a provincial councilor of the Province of Lucca with the Italian Liberal Party, with which he is elected deputy in 1992.

In 1994 he returned to entrepreneurial activity and held various positions in companies in the pharmaceutical and tourism sectors owned by his family.

In 2006 he failed the election as senator with The Daisy, but becomes Undersecretary for Cultural Heritage in the Prodi II Cabinet. In 2008 he was elected as senator with the Democratic Party (PD), office he held since then being re-elected in 2013 and 2018.

Very close to former prime minister Matteo Renzi, he was the PD group leader at the Senate between 2018 and 2021.

References

External links 
Files about his parliamentary activities (in Italian): XI,XVI,XVII, XVIII legislature.

1965 births
Living people
Italian Liberal Party politicians
Democratic Party (Italy) politicians
Deputies of Legislature XI of Italy
Senators of Legislature XVI of Italy
Senators of Legislature XVII of Italy
Senators of Legislature XVIII of Italy
People from Barga, Tuscany